Chimaerosphecia is a genus of moths in the family Sesiidae.

Species
Chimaerosphecia aegerides  Strand, [1916]
Chimaerosphecia colochelyna  Bryk, 1947
Chimaerosphecia sinensis (Walker, [1865])

References

Sesiidae